The 1965–66 NCAA College Division men's ice hockey season began in November 1965 and concluded in March of the following year. This was the 2nd season of second-tier college ice hockey.

Regular season

Season tournaments

Standings

See also
 1965–66 NCAA University Division men's ice hockey season

References

External links

 
NCAA